Kimchi is a web management tool to manage Kernel-based Virtual Machine (KVM) infrastructure. Developed with HTML5, Kimchi is developed to intuitively manage KVM guests, create storage pools, manage network interfaces (bridges, VLANs, NAT), and perform other related tasks. The name is an extended acronym for KVM infrastructure management. It is an Apache-licensed project hosted on GitHub, and incubated by oVirt.org.

References

 Kimchi Page @ Github
 Kimchi @ KVM Forum Presentation by Adam Litke
 Kimchi announcement @ Developers Works
 Kimchi being submitted as oVirt incubated project

Virtualization software
Web development